Dif is a settlement divided between Kenya's Wajir County and Somalia's Gedo  region.

Demographics 
Dif is primarily and exclusively inhabited by the Marehan,Darood clan and is home to the Urmidig sub clan.

References 

Populated places in North Eastern Province (Kenya)
Wajir County
Divided cities
Populated places in Lower Juba